McDaniel Lake is a  source of water for the city of Springfield, Missouri currently owned and operated by City Utilities of Springfield as their public water source.

Recreational activities 

McDaniel Lake is considered a "restricted" lake meaning boating, floating, swimming and docks are not allowed on the water surface.  Fishing, however is allowed and encouraged off of the  concrete bridge running west to east over the lake at one of its smaller sections.

Lake creation and etymology 

McDaniel Lake was created by impounding the Little Sac River in 1929, making it one of the oldest man-made dams in the area, with the dam at Fellows Lake being built in 1957.  The McDaniel Lake dam was raised to increase lake-water storage in 1992, making it more visible from the solitary bridge.

Fishing and accessibility 

The lake is only accessible by vehicle at two points:  one being Farm Roads 145/151 and a second at a smaller crossing on Farm Road 159.  Both roads contain large bridges from which people can fish, though the Farm Road 145/151 bridge is popularized as being a better fishing location.

The lake boasts a variable amount of species of fish including carp, small mouth bass and large mouth bass, white bass, channel catfish and several sunfish.  The lake itself is quickly gathering attention as being a top site in Southwest Missouri for fishing due to its serenity and peacefulness.

References 

 

Buildings and structures in Greene County, Missouri
Protected areas of Greene County, Missouri
Reservoirs in Missouri
Bodies of water of Greene County, Missouri